Sébastien Berlier is a French triathlete.

He won the bronze medal at the 2007 ITU Long Distance Triathlon World Championships in Lorient, becoming third behind World Champion Julien Loy and Xavier Le Floch who also participate for France.

External links
Runnersweb.com report

Living people
Year of birth missing (living people)
French male triathletes
21st-century French people